Aechmea kleinii is a plant species in the genus Aechmea. This species is endemic to southern Brazil, States of Santa Catarina and Rio Grande do Sul.

References

kleinii
Endemic flora of Brazil
Flora of the Atlantic Forest
Flora of Santa Catarina (state)
Plants described in 1954
Endangered flora of South America
Garden plants of South America